Elaphropus striatulus is a species of ground beetle in the subfamily Trechinae. It was described by Andrewes in 1925.

References

Beetles described in 1925